The hypothalamic sulcus (sulcus of Monro) is a groove in the lateral wall of the third ventricle, marking the boundary between the thalamus and hypothalamus. The upper and lower portions of the lateral wall of the third ventricle correspond to the alar lamina and basal lamina, respectively, of the lateral wall of the fore-brain vesicle and are separated from each other by a furrow, the hypothalamic sulcus, which extends from the interventricular foramen to the cerebral aqueduct.

References

External links
 

Diencephalon
Ventricular system